Ibn Khaldun (27 May 1332 – 17 March 1406, 732-808 AH) was an Arab sociologist, philosopher, and historian widely acknowledged to be one of the greatest social scientists of the Middle Ages, who made major contributions in the areas of historiography, sociology, economics, and demography.

His best-known book, the Muqaddimah or Prolegomena ("Introduction"), which he wrote in six months as he states in his autobiography, influenced 17th-century and 19th-century Ottoman historians such as Kâtip Çelebi, Mustafa Naima and Ahmed Cevdet Pasha, who used its theories to analyze the growth and decline of the Ottoman Empire. Ibn Khaldun interacted with Tamerlane, the founder of the Timurid Empire.

Recently, Ibn Khaldun's works have been compared with those of influential European philosophers such as Niccolò Machiavelli, Giambattista Vico, David Hume, G. W. F. Hegel, Karl Marx, and Auguste Comte as well as the economists David Ricardo and Adam Smith, suggesting that their ideas found precedent (although not direct influence) in his. He has also been influential on certain modern Islamic thinkers (e.g. those of the traditionalist school), as well as on Reaganomics.

Family 

Ibn Khaldun's life is relatively well-documented, as he wrote an autobiography ("Presenting Ibn Khaldun and his Journey West and East") in which numerous documents regarding his life are quoted word-for-word.

Abdurahman bin Muhammad bin Muhammad bin Muhammad bin Al-Hasan bin Jabir bin Muhammad bin Ibrahim bin Abdurahman bin Ibn Khaldun al-Hadrami, generally known as "Ibn Khaldūn" after a remote ancestor, was born in Tunis in AD 1332 (732 AH) into an upper-class Andalusian family of Arab descent, the family's ancestor was a Hadhrami who shared kinship with Waíl ibn Hujr, a companion of the Islamic prophet Muhammad. His family, which held many high offices in Al-Andalus, had emigrated to Tunisia after the fall of Seville to the Reconquista in AD 1248. Although some of his family members had held political office in the Tunisian Hafsid dynasty, his father and grandfather later withdrew from political life and joined a mystical order. His brother, Yahya Khaldun, was also a historian who wrote a book on the Abdalwadid dynasty and was assassinated by a rival for being the official historiographer of the court.

In his autobiography, Khaldun traces his descent back to the time of Muhammad through an Arab tribe from the south of the Arabian Peninsula, specifically the Hadhramaut, which came to the Iberian Peninsula in the 8th century, at the beginning of the Islamic conquest: "And our ancestry is from Hadhramaut, from the Arabs of Arabian Peninsula, via Wa'il ibn Hujr also known as Hujr ibn 'Adi, from the best of the Arabs, well-known and respected." (p. 2429, Al-Waraq's edition).

However, the modern biographer Mohammad Enan emphasised the unclear origins of Ibn Khaldun relying on the fact that Ibn Khaldun's criticism of Arabs might be a valid reason to cast doubt on his Arab origin. On the other hand, Ibn Khaldun's insistence and attachment to his claim of Arab ancestry at a time of Berber dynasties domination is also a valid reason to believe his claim.

Education 
His family's high rank enabled Ibn Khaldun to study with prominent teachers in Maghreb. He received a classical Islamic education, studying the Quran, which he memorized by heart, Arabic linguistics; the basis for understanding the Qur'an, hadith, sharia (law) and fiqh (jurisprudence). He received certification (ijazah) for all of those subjects. The mathematician and philosopher Al-Abili of Tlemcen introduced him to mathematics, logic and philosophy, and he studied especially the works of Averroes, Avicenna, Razi and Tusi. At the age of 17, Ibn Khaldūn lost both his parents to the Black Death, an intercontinental epidemic of the plague that hit Tunis in 1348–1349.

Following family tradition, he strove for a political career. In the face of a tumultuous political situation in North Africa, that required a high degree of skill in developing and dropping alliances prudently to avoid falling with the short-lived regimes of the time. Ibn Khaldūn's autobiography is the story of an adventure, in which he spends time in prison, reaches the highest offices and falls again into exile.

Political career 

At the age of 20, he began his political career in the chancellery of the Tunisian ruler Ibn Tafrakin with the position of Kātib al-'Alāmah (seal-bearer), which consisted of writing in fine calligraphy the typical introductory notes of official documents. In 1352, Abū Ziad, the sultan of Constantine, marched on Tunis and defeated it. Ibn Khaldūn, in any case unhappy with his respected but politically meaningless position, followed his teacher Abili to Fez. There, the Marinid sultan, Abū Inan Fares I, appointed him as a writer of royal proclamations, but Ibn Khaldūn still schemed against his employer, which, in 1357, got the 25-year-old a 22-month prison sentence. Upon the death of Abū Inan in 1358, Vizier al-Hasān ibn-Umar granted him freedom and reinstated him to his rank and offices. Ibn Khaldūn then schemed against Abū Inan's successor, Abū Salem Ibrahim III, with Abū Salem's exiled uncle, Abū Salem. When Abū Salem came to power, he gave Ibn Khaldūn a ministerial position, the first position to correspond with Ibn Khaldūn's ambitions.

The treatment that Ibn Khaldun received after the fall of Abū Salem through Ibn-Amar ʻAbdullah, a friend of Ibn Khaldūn's, was not to his liking, as he received no significant official position. At the same time, Amar successfully prevented Ibn Khaldūn, whose political skills he knew well, from allying with the Abd al-Wadids in Tlemcen. Ibn Khaldūn, therefore, decided to move to Granada. He could be sure of a positive welcome there since at Fez, he had helped the Sultan of Granada, the Nasrid Muhammad V, regain power from his temporary exile. In 1364, Muhammad entrusted him with a diplomatic mission to the king of Castile, Pedro the Cruel, to endorse a peace treaty. Ibn Khaldūn successfully carried out this mission and politely declined Pedro's offer to remain at his court and have his family's Spanish possessions returned to him.

In Granada, Ibn Khaldūn quickly came into competition with Muhammad's vizier, Ibn al-Khatib, who viewed the close relationship between Muhammad and Ibn Khaldūn with increasing mistrust. Ibn Khaldūn tried to shape the young Muhammad into his ideal of a wise ruler, an enterprise that Ibn al-Khatib thought foolish and a danger to peace in the country. History proved al-Khatib right, and at his instigation, Ibn Khaldūn was eventually sent back to North Africa. Al-Khatib himself was later accused by Muhammad of having unorthodox philosophical views and murdered despite an attempt by Ibn Khaldūn to intercede on behalf of his old rival.

In his autobiography, Ibn Khaldūn tells little about his conflict with Ibn al-Khatib and the reasons for his departure. Orientalist Muhsin Mahdi interprets that as showing that Ibn Khaldūn later realised that he had completely misjudged Muhammad V.

Back in Ifriqiya, the Hafsid sultan of Bougie, Abū ʻAbdallāh, who had been his companion in prison, received him with great enthusiasm and made Ibn Khaldūn his prime minister. Ibn Khaldūn carried out a daring mission to collect taxes among the local Berber tribes. After the death of Abū ʻAbdallāh in 1366, Ibn Khaldūn changed sides once again and allied himself with the Sultan of Tlemcen, Abū l-Abbas. A few years later, he was taken prisoner by Abu Faris Abdul Aziz, who had defeated the sultan of Tlemcen and seized the throne. He then entered a monastic establishment and occupied himself with scholastic duties until 1370. In that year, he was sent for to Tlemcen by the new sultan. After the death of ʻAbdu l-Azīz, he resided at Fez, enjoying the patronage and confidence of the regent.

Ibn Khaldūn's political skills and, above all, his good relationship with the wild Berber tribes were in high demand among the North African rulers, but he had begun to tire of politics and constantly switching allegiances. In 1375, he was sent by Abū Hammu, the ʻAbdu l Wadid Sultan of Tlemcen, on a mission to the Dawadida Arabs tribes of Biskra. After his return to the West, Ibn Khaldūn sought refuge with one of the Berber tribes in the west of Algeria, in the town of Qalat Ibn Salama. He lived there for over three years under their protection, taking advantage of his seclusion to write the Muqaddimah "Prolegomena", the introduction to his planned history of the world. In Ibn Salama, however, he lacked the necessary texts to complete the work. Therefore, in 1378, he returned to his native Tunis, which had meanwhile been conquered by Abū l-Abbas, who took Ibn Khaldūn back into his service. There, he devoted himself almost exclusively to his studies and completed his history of the world. His relationship with Abū l-Abbas remained strained, as the latter questioned his loyalty. That was brought into sharp contrast after Ibn Khaldūn presented him with a copy of the completed history that omitted the usual panegyric to the ruler. Under pretence of going on the Hajj to Mecca, something for which a Muslim ruler could not simply refuse permission, Ibn Khaldūn was able to leave Tunis and to sail to Alexandria.

Later life 

Ibn Khaldun said of Egypt, "He who has not seen it does not know the power of Islam." While other Islamic regions had to cope with border wars and inner strife, Mamluk Egypt enjoyed prosperity and high culture. In 1384, the Egyptian Sultan, al-Malik udh-Dhahir Barquq, made Khaldun professor of the Qamhiyyah Madrasah and appointed him as the Grand qadi of the Maliki school of fiqh (one of four schools, the Maliki school was widespread primarily in Western Africa). His efforts at reform encountered resistance, however, and within a year, he had to resign his judgeship. Also in 1384, a ship carrying Khaldun's wife and children sank off of Alexandria.

After his return from a pilgrimage to Mecca in May 1388, Ibn Khaldūn concentrated on teaching at various Cairo madrasas. At the Mamluk court he fell from favor because during revolts against Barquq, he had, apparently under duress, with other Cairo jurists, issued a fatwa against Barquq. Later relations with Barquq returned to normal, and he was once again named the Maliki qadi. Altogether, he was called six times to that high office, which, for various reasons, he never held long.

In 1401, under Barquq's successor, his son Faraj, Ibn Khaldūn took part in a military campaign against the Mongol conqueror, Timur, who besieged Damascus in 1400. Ibn Khaldūn cast doubt upon the viability of the venture and really wanted to stay in Egypt. His doubts were vindicated, as the young and inexperienced Faraj, concerned about a revolt in Egypt, left his army to its own devices in Syria and hurried home. Ibn Khaldūn remained at the besieged city for seven weeks, being lowered over the city wall by ropes to negotiate with Timur, in a historic series of meetings that he reported extensively in his autobiography. Timur questioned him in detail about conditions in the lands of the Maghreb. At his request, Ibn Khaldūn even wrote a long report about it. As he recognized Timur's intentions, he did not hesitate, on his return to Egypt, to compose an equally-extensive report on the history of the Tatars, together with a character study of Timur, sending them to the Merinid rulers in Fez (Maghreb).

Ibn Khaldūn spent the next five years in Cairo completing his autobiography and his history of the world and acting as teacher and judge. Meanwhile, he was alleged to have joined an underground party, Rijal Hawa Rijal, whose reform-oriented ideals attracted the attention of local political authorities. The elderly Ibn Khaldun was placed under arrest. He died on 17 March 1406, one month after his sixth selection for the office of the Maliki qadi (Judge).

Works

al-Muqaddima and the rest of Kitāb al-ʻIbar 
 Kitāb al-ʻIbar, (full title: Kitāb al-ʻIbar wa-Dīwān al-Mubtadaʼ wa-l-Khabar fī Taʼrīkh al-ʻArab wa-l-Barbar wa-Man ʻĀṣarahum min Dhawī ash-Shaʼn al-Akbār "Book of Lessons, Record of Beginnings and Events in the History of the Arabs and the Berbers and Their Powerful Contemporaries");  begun as a history of the Berbers and expanded to a universal history in seven books.
Book 1; Al-Muqaddima ('The Introduction'),  a socio-economic-geographical universal history of empires, and the best known of his works.
Books 2–5; World History up to the author's own time.
Books 6–7; Historiography of the Berbers and the Maghreb.  Khaldun departs from the classical style of Arab historians by synthesising multiple, sometimes contradictory, sources without citations.  He reproduces some errors originating probably from his 14th-century Fez source, the work Rawḍ al-Qirṭās by Ibn Abi Zar, yet  Al-'Ibar remains an invaluable source of Berber history.

Concerning the discipline of sociology, he described the dichotomy of sedentary life versus nomadic life as well as the inevitable loss of power that occurs when warriors conquer a city. According to the Arab scholar Sati' al-Husri, the Muqaddimah may be read as a sociological work. The work is based around Ibn Khaldun's central concept of 'aṣabiyyah, which has been translated as "social cohesion", "group solidarity", or "tribalism". This social cohesion arises spontaneously in tribes and other small kinship groups; it can be intensified and enlarged by a religious ideology. Ibn Khaldun's analysis looks at how this cohesion carries groups to power but contains within itself the seeds – psychological, sociological, economic, political – of the group's downfall, to be replaced by a new group, dynasty or empire bound by a stronger (or at least younger and more vigorous) cohesion. Some of Ibn Khaldun's views, particularly those concerning the Zanj people of sub-Saharan Africa, have been cited as racist, though they were not uncommon for their time. According to the scholar Abdelmajid Hannoum, Ibn Khaldun's description of the distinctions between Berbers and Arabs were misinterpreted by the translator William McGuckin de Slane, who wrongly inserted a "racial ideology that sets Arabs and Berbers apart and in opposition" into his translation of part of`Ibar translated under the title Histoire des Berbères.

Perhaps the most frequently cited observation drawn from Ibn Khaldūn's work is the notion that when a society becomes a great civilization, its high point is followed by a period of decay. This means that the next cohesive group that conquers the diminished civilization is, by comparison, a group of barbarians. Once the barbarians solidify their control over the conquered society, however, they become attracted to its more refined aspects, such as literacy and arts, and either assimilate into or appropriate such cultural practices. Then, eventually, the former barbarians will be conquered by a new set of barbarians, who will repeat the process.

Georgetown University Professor Ibrahim Oweiss, an economist and historian, argues that Ibn Khaldun was a major forerunner of modern economists and, in particular, originated the labor theory of value long before better known proponents such as Adam Smith and David Ricardo, although Khaldun did not refer to it as either a labor theory of value or theory.

Ibn Khaldun also called for the creation of a science to explain society and went on to outline these ideas in his major work, the Muqaddimah, which states that “Civilization and its well-being, as well as business prosperity, depend on productivity and people’s efforts in all directions in their own interest and profit”.

Ibn Khaldun diverged from norms that Muslim historians followed and rejected their focus on the credibility of the transmitter and focused instead on the validity of the stories and encouraged critical thinking.

Ibn Khaldun also outlines early theories of division of labor, taxes, scarcity, and economic growth.

He argued that poverty was a result of the destruction of morality and human values. He also looked at what factors contribute to wealth, such as consumption, government, and investment. Khaldun also argued that poverty was not necessarily a result of poor financial decision-making but of external consequences and therefore the government should be involved in alleviating poverty. Researchers from Malaysia's Insaniah University College and Indonesia's Tazkia University College of Islamic Economics created a dynamics model based upon Ibn Khaldun's writings to measure poverty in the Muslim nations of South Asia and Southeast Asia.

Ibn Khaldun also believed that the currency of an Islamic monetary system should have intrinsic value and therefore be made of gold and silver (such as the dirham). He emphasized that the weight and purity of these coins should be strictly followed: the weight of one dinar should be one mithqal (the weight of 72 grains of barley, roughly 4.25 grams) and the weight of 7 dinar should be equal to weight of 10 dirhams (7/10 of a mithqal or 2.96 grams).

Ibn Khaldun's writings regarding the division of labor are often compared to Adam Smith's writings on the topic.

Both Ibn Khaldun and Smith shared the idea that the division of labor is fundamental to economic growth, however, the motivations and context for such division differed between them. For Ibn Khaldun, asabiyyah or social solidarity was the underlying motive and context behind the division of labor; for Smith it was self-interest and the market economy.

Social thought 
Ibn Khaldun's epistemology attempted to reconcile mysticism with theology by dividing science into two different categories, the religious science that regards the sciences of the Qur'an and the non-religious science. He further classified the non-religious sciences into intellectual sciences such as logic, arithmetic, geometry, astronomy, etc. and auxiliary sciences such as language, literature, poetry, etc. He also suggested that possibly more divisions will appear in the future with different societies. He tried to adapt to all possible societies’ cultural behavior and influence in education, economics and politics. Nonetheless, he didn't think that laws were chosen by just one leader or a small group of individual but mostly by the majority of the individuals of a society.

To Ibn Khaldun, the state was a necessity of human society to restrain injustice within the society, but the state means is force, thus itself an injustice. All societies must have a state governing them in order to establish a society. He attempted to standardize the history of societies by identifying ubiquitous phenomena present in all societies. To him, civilization was a phenomenon that will be present as long as humans exist. He characterized the fulfillment of basic needs as the beginning of civilization. At the beginning, people will look for different ways of increasing productivity of basic needs and expansion will occur. Later the society starts becoming more sedentary and focuses more on crafting, arts and the more refined characteristics. By the end of a society, it will weaken, allowing another small group of individuals to come into control. The conquering group is described as an unsatisfied group within the society itself or a group of desert bandits that constantly attack other weaker or weakened societies.

In the Muqaddimah, his most important work, he discusses an introduction of philosophy to history in a general manner, based on observable patterns within a theoretical framework of known historical events of his time. He described the beginnings, development, cultural trends and the fall of all societies, leading to the rise of a new society which would then follow the same trends in a continuous cycle. Also, he recommended the best political approaches to develop a society according to his knowledge of history. He heavily emphasized that a good society would be one in which a tradition of education is deeply rooted in its culture.
Ibn Khaldun (1987) introduced the word asabiya (solidarity, group feeling, or group consciousness), to explain tribalism. The concept of asabiya has been translated as "social cohesion," "group solidarity," or "tribalism." This social cohesion arises spontaneously in tribes and other small kinship groups (Rashed,2017).

Ibn Khaldun believed that too much bureaucracy, such as taxes and legislations, would lead to the decline of a society, since it would constrain the development of more specialized labor (increase in scholars and development of different services). He believed that bureaucrats cannot understand the world of commerce and do not possess the same motivation as a businessman.

In his work the Muqaddimah, Ibn Khaldun emphasizes human beings' faculty to think (fikr) as what determines human behavior and ubiquitous patterns. This faculty is also what inspires human beings to form into a social structure to co-operate in division of labor and organization.  According to Zaid Ahmand in Epistemology and the Human Dimension in Urban Studies, the fikr faculty is the supporting pillar for all philosophical aspects of Ibn Khaldun's theory related to human beings’ spiritual, intellectual, physical, social and political tendencies.

Another important concept he emphasizes in his work is the mastery of crafts, habits and skills. This takes place after a society is established and according to Ibn Khaldun the level of achievement of a society can be determined by just analyzing these three concepts. A society in its earliest stages is nomadic and primarily concerned with survival, while a society at a later stage is sedentary, with greater achievement in crafts. A society with a sedentary culture and stable politics would be expected to have greater achievements in crafts and technology.

Ibn Khaldun also emphasized in his epistemology the important aspect that educational tradition plays to ensure the new generations of a civilization continuously improve in the sciences and develop culture. Ibn Khaldun argued that without the strong establishment of an educational tradition, it would be very difficult for the new generations to maintain the achievements of the earlier generations, let alone improve them.

Another way to distinguish the achievement of a society would be the language of a society, since for him the most important element of a society would not be land, but the language spoken. He was surprised that many non-Arabs were really successful in the Arabic society, had good jobs and were well received by the community. "These people were non-Arab by descent, but they grew up among the Arabs who possessed the habit of Arabic," Ibn Khaldun once recalled, "[b]ecause of this, they were able to master Arabic so well that they cannot be surpassed." He believed that the reason why non-Arabs were accepted as part of Arab society was due to their mastery of the Arabic language.

Advancements in literary works such as poems and prose were another way to distinguish the achievement of a civilization, but Ibn Khaldun believed that whenever the literary facet of a society reaches its highest levels it ceases to indicate societal achievements anymore, but is an embellishment of life. For logical sciences he established knowledge at its highest level as an increase of scholars and the quality of knowledge. For him the highest level of literary productions would be the manifestation of prose, poems and the artistic enrichment of a society.

Minor works 
From other sources we know of several other works, primarily composed during the time he spent in North Africa and Al-Andalus. His first book, Lubābu l-Muhassal, a commentary on the Islamic theology of Fakhr al-Din al-Razi, was written at the age of 19 under the supervision of his teacher al-Ābilī in Tunis. A work on Sufism, Shifā'u l-Sā'il, was composed around 1373 in Fes, Morocco. Whilst at the court of Muhammed V, Sultan of Granada, Ibn Khaldūn composed a work on logic, ʻallaqa li-s-Sulṭān.

Legacy

Egypt 
Ibn Khaldun's historical method had very few precedents or followers in his time. While Ibn Khaldun is known to have been a successful lecturer on jurisprudence within religious sciences, only very few of his students were aware of, and influenced by, his Muqaddimah. One such student, Al-Maqrizi, praised the Muqaddimah, although some scholars have found his praise, and that of others, to be generally empty and lacking understanding of Ibn Khaldun's methods.

Ibn Khaldun also faced primarily criticism from his contemporaries, particularly Ibn Hajar al-`Asqalani. These criticisms included accusations of inadequate historical knowledge, an inaccurate title, disorganization, and a style resembling that of the prolific Arab literature writer, Al-Jahiz. Al-Asqalani also noted that Ibn Khaldun was not well-liked in Egypt because he opposed many respected traditions, including the traditional judicial dress, and suggested that this may have contributed to the reception of Ibn Khaldun's historical works. The notable exception to this consensus was Ibn al-Azraq, a jurist who lived shortly after Ibn Khaldun and quoted heavily from the first and fourth books of the Kitab al-‘Ibar, in developing a work of mirrors for princes.

Ottoman Empire 
Ibn Khaldun's work found some recognition with Ottoman intellectuals in the 17th century. The first references to Ibn Khaldun in Ottoman writings appeared in the middle of the 17th century, with historians such as Kâtip Çelebi naming him as a great influence, while another Turkish Ottoman historian, Mustafa Naima, attempted to use Ibn Khaldun's cyclical theory of the rise and fall of empires to describe the Ottoman Empire. Increasing perceptions of the decline of the Ottoman Empire also caused similar ideas to appear independently of Ibn Khaldun in the 16th century, and may explain some of the influence of his works.

Europe 
In Europe, Ibn Khaldun was first brought to the attention of the Western world in 1697, when a biography of him appeared in Barthélemy d'Herbelot de Molainville's Bibliothèque Orientale. However, some scholars believe that Ibn Khaldun's work may have first been introduced to Europe via Ibn Arabshah's biography of Tamerlane, translated to Latin, which covers a meeting between Ibn Khaldun and Tamerlane. According to Ibn Arabshah, during this meeting, Ibn Khaldun and Tamerlane discussed the Maghrib in depth, as well as Tamerlane's genealogy and place in history. Ibn Khaldun began gaining more attention from 1806, when Silvestre de Sacy's Chrestomathie Arabe included his biography together with a translation of parts of the Muqaddimah as the Prolegomena. In 1816, de Sacy again published a biography with a more detailed description on the Prolegomena. More details on and partial translations of the Prolegomena emerged over the years until the complete Arabic edition was published in 1858. Since then, the work of Ibn Khaldun has been extensively studied in the Western world with special interest. Reynold A. Nicholson praised Ibn Khaldun as a uniquely brilliant Muslim sociologist, but discounted Khaldun's influence. Spanish Philosopher José Ortega y Gasset viewed the conflicts of North Africa as a problem that stemmed from a lack of African thought, and praised Ibn Khaldun for making sense of the conflict by simplifying it to the relationship between the nomadic and sedentary modes of life.

Modern historians 
British historian Arnold J. Toynbee has called Ibn Khaldun's Muqaddimah "the greatest work of its kind." Ernest Gellner, once a professor of philosophy and logic at the London School of Economics, considered Khaldun's definition of government the best in the history of political theory.

More moderate views on the scope of Ibn Khaldun's contributions have also emerged. 

Arthur Laffer, for whom the Laffer curve is named, acknowledged that Ibn Khaldun's ideas, as well as others, precede his own work on that curve.

Economist Paul Krugman described Ibn Khaldun as "a 14th-century Islamic philosopher who basically invented what we would now call the social sciences".

19th century Scottish theologian and philosopher Robert Flint praised him strongly, "as a theorist of history he had no equal in any age or country until Vico appeared, more than three hundred years later. Plato, Aristotle, and Augustine were not his peers, and all others were unworthy of being even mentioned along with him". Ibn Khaldun's work on evolution of societies also influenced Egon Orowan, who termed the concept of socionomy. While Ibn Khaldun's record-keeping is usually passed over in favor of recognizing his contributions to the science of history, Abderrahmane Lakhsassi wrote "No historian of the Maghreb since and particularly of the Berbers can do without his historical contribution."

Public recognition 
Public recognition of Ibn Khaldun has increased in recent years. In 2004, the Tunisian Community Center launched the first Ibn Khaldun Award to recognize a Tunisian/American high achiever whose work reflects Ibn Khaldun's ideas of kinship and solidarity. The Award was named after Ibn Khaldun for the convergence of his ideas with the organization's objectives and programs. In 2006, the Atlas Economic Research Foundation launched an annual essay contest for students named in Ibn Khaldun's honor. The theme of the contest is "how individuals, think tanks, universities and entrepreneurs can influence government policies to allow the free market to flourish and improve the lives of its citizens based on Islamic teachings and traditions." In 2006, Spain commemorated the 600th anniversary of the death of Ibn Khaldun by orchestrating an exhibit titled "Encounter of Civilizations:  Ibn Khaldun."

In 2007, İbn Haldun Üniversitesi has opened in Istanbul, Turkey to commemorate his name. The university promotes a policy of trilingualism. The languages in question are English, Modern Turkish, and Arabic and its emphasis is on teaching social sciences.

In 1981 U.S. President Ronald Reagan cited Ibn Khaldun as an influence on his supply-side economic policies, also known as Reaganomics. He paraphrased Ibn Khaldun, who said that "in the beginning of the dynasty, great tax revenues were gained from small assessments," and that "at the end of the dynasty, small tax revenues were gained from large assessments." Reagan said his goal is "trying to get down to the small assessments and the great revenues."

The Iraqi Navy named a frigate after Ibn Khaldun.

Bibliography 
 Kitāb al-ʻIbar wa-Dīwān al-Mubtadaʼ wa-l-Khabar fī Taʼrīkh al-ʻArab wa-l-Barbar wa-Man ʻĀṣarahum min Dhawī ash-Shaʼn al-Akbār
 Lubābu-l-Muhassal fee Uswoolu-d-Deen
 Shifā'u-s-Sā'il
 ʻAl-Laqaw li-s-Sulṭān
 Ibn Khaldun. 1951 التعريف بإبن خلدون ورحلته غربا وشرقا Al-Taʻrīf bi Ibn-Khaldūn wa Riħlatuhu Għarbān wa Sharqān. Published by Muħammad ibn-Tāwīt at-Tanjī. Cairo (Autobiography in Arabic).
 Ibn Khaldūn. 1958 The Muqaddimah : An introduction to history. Translated from the Arabic by Franz Rosenthal. 3 vols. New York: Princeton.
 Ibn Khaldūn. 1967 The Muqaddimah : An introduction to history. Trans. Franz Rosenthal, ed. N.J. Dawood. (Abridged).
 Ibn Khaldun, 1332–1406. 1905 'A Selection from the Prolegomena of Ibn Khaldūn'. Trans. Duncan Macdonald

See also 

List of pre-modern Arab scientists and scholars
 Asabiyyah
 Chanakya
 Egon Orowan
 List of Muslim historians
 Historiography of early Islam
 Laffer curve
 Muqaddimah
 Science in medieval Islam
 Social cycle theory
 Averroes
 Abulcasis
 Ibn Arabi
 Ibn Tufail
 Sayyid Husayn Ahlati

Notes

References

Citations

Sources 

 Fuad Baali. 2005 The science of human social organization : Conflicting views on Ibn Khaldun's (1332–1406) Ilm al-umran. Mellen studies in sociology. Lewiston/NY: Edwin Mellen Press.
 
 Walter Fischel. 1967 Ibn Khaldun in Egypt : His public functions and his historical research, 1382–1406; a study in Islamic historiography. Berkeley: University of California Press.
 Allen Fromherz. 2010 "Ibn Khaldun : Life and Times". Edinburgh University Press, 2010.
 Ana Maria C. Minecan, 2012 "El vínculo comunitario y el poder en Ibn Jaldún" in José-Miguel Marinas (Ed.), Pensar lo político: Ensayos sobre comunidad y conflicto, Biblioteca Nueva, Madrid, 2012.
 Mahmoud Rabi'. 1967 The political theory of Ibn Khaldun. Leiden: E.J. Brill.
 Róbert Simon. 2002 Ibn Khaldūn : History as science and the patrimonial empire. Translated by Klára Pogátsa. Budapest: Akadémiai Kiadó. Original edition, 1999.

Further reading 
 Malise Ruthven, "The Otherworldliness of Ibn Khaldun" (review of Robert Irwin, Ibn Khaldun:  An Intellectual Biography, Princeton University Press, 2018, 243 pp.), The New York Review of Books, vol. LXVI, no. 2 (7 February 2019), pp. 23–24, 26.  "More than six centuries after Ibn Khaldun's death the modern world has much to learn from studying him.  After the Muqaddima itself, Irwin's intellectual biography... is an excellent place to begin."

External links

English 
 Ibn Khaldun: His Life and Work, by Muhammad Hozien
 
 
 Complete Muqaddimah/Kitab al-Ibar in English (without Chapter V, 13)
 The Tunisian American Center (US) 
 Ibn Khaldun on the Web
 Muslim Scientists and Scholars – Ibn Khaldun
 Ibn Khaldun’s Philosophy of Management and Work
 Ibn Khaldun (al-Muqaddimah): Methodology & concepts of economic sociology
 Ibn Khaldun. The Mediterranean in the 14th century: Rise and fall of Empires. Andalusian Legacy exhibition in the Alcazar of Seville
 The Ibn Khaldun Community Service Award© 
 Ibn Khaldun meets Al Saud
 The Ibn Khaldun Institute 
 The Tunisian American Day©

Non-English 
 Multilingual tunisian academic web site on Ibn Khaldun
  Exposé simplifié sur la théologie scolastique
 Chapters from the Muqaddimah and the History of Ibn Khaldun 
 Ismail Küpeli: Ibn Khaldun und das politische System Syriens – Eine Gegenüberstellung, München, 2007,  (German e-book about the politics of Syria with reference to the political theory of Ibn Khaldun)
 Kuchinov A.M. Ibn Khaldun influence on social thought development // Lomonosov-2013. – Moscow, 2013. In Russian.
 Master's thesis on Ibn Khaldun published by FFLCH-USP in 2017 Roschel, Renato – São Paulo, 2017. In Portuguese.

1332 births
1406 deaths
14th-century historians from al-Andalus
14th-century Arabic writers
14th-century Egyptian historians
14th-century jurists
15th-century Arabic writers
15th-century jurists
African people of Arab descent
Arab anthropologists
Arab diaspora in Africa
Arab political philosophers
Arab Sunni Muslim scholars of Islam
Asharis
Autobiographers
Critics of Ibn Arabi
Hadhrami people
Islamic philosophers
Malikis
Mujaddid
People from Tunis
Philosophers of economics
Philosophers of history
Philosophers of the medieval Islamic world
Political philosophy in medieval Islam
Economists of the medieval Islamic world
Theoretical historians
University of al-Qarawiyyin alumni
Writers about globalization